The Preobrazhensky Constituency (No.205) is a Russian legislative constituency in Moscow. It is based in Eastern Moscow.

Members elected

Election results

1993

|-
! colspan=2 style="background-color:#E9E9E9;text-align:left;vertical-align:top;" |Candidate
! style="background-color:#E9E9E9;text-align:left;vertical-align:top;" |Party
! style="background-color:#E9E9E9;text-align:right;" |Votes
! style="background-color:#E9E9E9;text-align:right;" |%
|-
|style="background-color:#78866B"|
|align=left|Aleksandr Zhukov
|align=left|Dignity and Charity
|62,407
|23.57%
|-
|style="background-color:"|
|align=left|Andrey Frolov
|align=left|Yavlinsky—Boldyrev—Lukin
| -
|15.95%
|-
| colspan="5" style="background-color:#E9E9E9;"|
|- style="font-weight:bold"
| colspan="3" style="text-align:left;" | Total
| 264,820
| 100%
|-
| colspan="5" style="background-color:#E9E9E9;"|
|- style="font-weight:bold"
| colspan="4" |Source:
|
|}

1995

|-
! colspan=2 style="background-color:#E9E9E9;text-align:left;vertical-align:top;" |Candidate
! style="background-color:#E9E9E9;text-align:left;vertical-align:top;" |Party
! style="background-color:#E9E9E9;text-align:right;" |Votes
! style="background-color:#E9E9E9;text-align:right;" |%
|-
|style="background-color:#1C1A0D"|
|align=left|Aleksandr Zhukov (incumbent)
|align=left|Forward, Russia!
|44,203
|15.49%
|-
|style="background-color:"|
|align=left|Valery Loginov
|align=left|Communist Party
|35,154
|12.32%
|-
|style="background-color:"|
|align=left|Irina Osokina
|align=left|Independent
|32,872
|11.52%
|-
|style="background-color:"|
|align=left|Valery Kuzin
|align=left|Independent
|29,425
|10.31%
|-
|style="background-color:"|
|align=left|Andrey Frolov
|align=left|Democratic Russia and Free Trade Unions
|13,697
|4.80%
|-
|style="background-color:#1A1A1A"|
|align=left|Tamara Solomatina
|align=left|Stanislav Govorukhin Bloc
|12,590
|4.41%
|-
|style="background-color:"|
|align=left|Mikhail Chelnokov
|align=left|Independent
|12,344
|4.32%
|-
|style="background-color:"|
|align=left|Vladimir Pukhov
|align=left|Independent
|8,096
|2.84%
|-
|style="background-color:#265BAB"|
|align=left|Gasan Mirzoev
|align=left|Russian Lawyers' Association
|7,818
|2.74%
|-
|style="background-color:"|
|align=left|Aleksandr Filatov
|align=left|Liberal Democratic Party
|6,901
|2.42%
|-
|style="background-color:#FF8201"|
|align=left|Anatoly Pchelintsev
|align=left|Christian-Democratic Union - Christians of Russia
|6,556
|2.30%
|-
|style="background-color:"|
|align=left|Albert Miroshnikov
|align=left|Agrarian Party
|4,270
|1.50%
|-
|style="background-color:"|
|align=left|Feliks Yemelin
|align=left|Independent
|4,182
|1.47%
|-
|style="background-color:"|
|align=left|Olga Bukharkova
|align=left|Independent
|3,352
|1.17%
|-
|style="background-color:"|
|align=left|Aleksandr Muzychenko
|align=left|Faith, Work, Conscience
|3,325
|1.16%
|-
|style="background-color:"|
|align=left|German Khrustalyov
|align=left|Independent
|3,178
|1.11%
|-
|style="background-color:#019CDC"|
|align=left|Aleksandr Kotenkov
|align=left|Party of Russian Unity and Accord
|2,951
|1.03%
|-
|style="background-color:"|
|align=left|Natalia Sidorova
|align=left|Independent
|2,657
|0.93%
|-
|style="background-color:#5A5A58"|
|align=left|Oleg Novikov
|align=left|Federal Democratic Movement
|2,432
|0.85%
|-
|style="background-color:"|
|align=left|Vyacheslav Astafyev
|align=left|Independent
|2,394
|0.84%
|-
|style="background-color:#DD137B"|
|align=left|Mikhail Kosarev
|align=left|Social Democrats
|2,040
|0.71%
|-
|style="background-color:#2998D5"|
|align=left|Aleksandr Obidin
|align=left|Russian All-People's Movement
|1,275
|0.45%
|-
|style="background-color:#000000"|
|colspan=2 |against all
|36,654
|12.84%
|-
| colspan="5" style="background-color:#E9E9E9;"|
|- style="font-weight:bold"
| colspan="3" style="text-align:left;" | Total
| 285,437
| 100%
|-
| colspan="5" style="background-color:#E9E9E9;"|
|- style="font-weight:bold"
| colspan="4" |Source:
|
|}

1999

|-
! colspan=2 style="background-color:#E9E9E9;text-align:left;vertical-align:top;" |Candidate
! style="background-color:#E9E9E9;text-align:left;vertical-align:top;" |Party
! style="background-color:#E9E9E9;text-align:right;" |Votes
! style="background-color:#E9E9E9;text-align:right;" |%
|-
|style="background-color:#3B9EDF"|
|align=left|Aleksandr Zhukov (incumbent)
|align=left|Fatherland – All Russia
|131,130
|46.38%
|-
|style="background-color:"|
|align=left|Arkady Baskaev
|align=left|Independent
|32,291
|11.42%
|-
|style="background-color:"|
|align=left|Irina Osokina
|align=left|Yabloko
|20,403
|7.22%
|-
|style="background-color:"|
|align=left|Andrey Kassirov
|align=left|Communist Party
|16,939
|5.99%
|-
|style="background-color:#FF4400"|
|align=left|Andrey Metelsky
|align=left|Andrey Nikolayev and Svyatoslav Fyodorov Bloc
|14,175
|5.01%
|-
|style="background-color:#1042A5"|
|align=left|Andrey Frolov
|align=left|Union of Right Forces
|12,021
|4.25%
|-
|style="background-color:"|
|align=left|Oleg Denisov
|align=left|Independent
|4,794
|1.70%
|-
|style="background-color:#FCCA19"|
|align=left|Anatoly Mostovoy
|align=left|Congress of Russian Communities-Yury Boldyrev Movement
|3,491
|1.23%
|-
|style="background-color:"|
|align=left|Yelena Rumyantseva
|align=left|Independent
|3,137
|1.11%
|-
|style="background-color:#084284"|
|align=left|Lidia Basmanova
|align=left|Spiritual Heritage
|2,273
|0.80%
|-
|style="background-color:"|
|align=left|Vladimir Ivanov
|align=left|Independent
|2,249
|0.80%
|-
|style="background-color:"|
|align=left|Vladimir Petrov
|align=left|Russian Ecological Party "Kedr"
|2,110
|0.75%
|-
|style="background-color:"|
|align=left|Andrey Banov
|align=left|Independent
|1,264
|0.45%
|-
|style="background-color:"|
|align=left|Vitaly Tyukov
|align=left|Independent
|1,178
|0.42%
|-
|style="background-color:"|
|align=left|Anatoly Rabinovich
|align=left|Independent
|999
|0.35%
|-
|style="background-color:#000000"|
|colspan=2 |against all
|27,558
|9.75%
|-
| colspan="5" style="background-color:#E9E9E9;"|
|- style="font-weight:bold"
| colspan="3" style="text-align:left;" | Total
| 282,746
| 100%
|-
| colspan="5" style="background-color:#E9E9E9;"|
|- style="font-weight:bold"
| colspan="4" |Source:
|
|}

2003

|-
! colspan=2 style="background-color:#E9E9E9;text-align:left;vertical-align:top;" |Candidate
! style="background-color:#E9E9E9;text-align:left;vertical-align:top;" |Party
! style="background-color:#E9E9E9;text-align:right;" |Votes
! style="background-color:#E9E9E9;text-align:right;" |%
|-
|style="background-color:"|
|align=left|Aleksandr Zhukov (incumbent)
|align=left|United Russia
|156,932
|65.55%
|-
|style="background-color:"|
|align=left|Valery Monakhov
|align=left|Communist Party
|16,067
|6.71%
|-
|style="background-color:"|
|align=left|Anton Morozov
|align=left|Liberal Democratic Party
|7,554
|3.16%
|-
|style="background-color:#14589F"|
|align=left|Georgy Minenko
|align=left|Development of Enterprise
|5,958
|2.49%
|-
|style="background-color:"|
|align=left|German Khrustalyov
|align=left|Independent
|3,027
|1.26%
|-
|style="background-color:#164C8C"|
|align=left|Maksim Palashchenko
|align=left|United Russian Party Rus'
|2,463
|1.03%
|-
|style="background-color:"|
|align=left|Leonid Shpigel
|align=left|Independent
|2,454
|1.03%
|-
|style="background-color:#000000"|
|colspan=2 |against all
|40,499
|16.92%
|-
| colspan="5" style="background-color:#E9E9E9;"|
|- style="font-weight:bold"
| colspan="3" style="text-align:left;" | Total
| 240,310
| 100%
|-
| colspan="5" style="background-color:#E9E9E9;"|
|- style="font-weight:bold"
| colspan="4" |Source:
|
|}

2004
The results of the by-election were invalidated due to low turnout and another by-election was scheduled for 4 December 2005

|-
! colspan=2 style="background-color:#E9E9E9;text-align:left;vertical-align:top;" |Candidate
! style="background-color:#E9E9E9;text-align:left;vertical-align:top;" |Party
! style="background-color:#E9E9E9;text-align:right;" |Votes
! style="background-color:#E9E9E9;text-align:right;" |%
|-
|style="background-color:"|
|align=left|Aleksandr Zhukov
|align=left|United Russia
|23,516
|23.04%
|-
|style="background-color:"|
|align=left|Sergey Shavrin
|align=left|Independent
|19,967
|19.56%
|-
|style="background-color:"|
|align=left|Sergey Mitrokhin
|align=left|Yabloko
|16,639
|16.30%
|-
|style="background-color:"|
|align=left|Mikhail Dvornikov
|align=left|Independent
|7,820
|7.66%
|-
|style="background-color:#D50000"|
|align=left|Yury Nazarov
|align=left|Russian Communist Workers Party-Russian Party of Communists
|7,708
|7.55%
|-
|style="background-color:"|
|align=left|Mikhail Delyagin
|align=left|Independent
|3,968
|3.88%
|-
|style="background-color:"|
|align=left|Andrey Cherepanov
|align=left|Independent
|3,091
|3.02%
|-
|style="background-color:"|
|align=left|Aleksey Nazarov
|align=left|Independent
|2,732
|2.67%
|-
|style="background-color:"|
|align=left|Anton Morozov
|align=left|Liberal Democratic Party
|2,169
|2.12%
|-
|style="background-color:"|
|align=left|Pyotr Khomyakov
|align=left|Independent
|940
|0.92%
|-
|style="background-color:"|
|align=left|Leonid Shpigel
|align=left|Independent
|728
|0.71%
|-
|style="background-color:#14589F"|
|align=left|Ivan Grachev
|align=left|Development of Enterprise
|659
|0.64%
|-
|style="background-color:"|
|align=left|Georgy Benyaguev
|align=left|Independent
|371
|0.36%
|-
|style="background-color:"|
|align=left|Andrey Priyatkin
|align=left|Independent
|290
|0.28%
|-
|style="background-color:#000000"|
|colspan=2 |against all
|9,680
|9.48%
|-
| colspan="5" style="background-color:#E9E9E9;"|
|- style="font-weight:bold"
| colspan="3" style="text-align:left;" | Total
| 102,061
| 100%
|-
| colspan="5" style="background-color:#E9E9E9;"|
|- style="font-weight:bold"
| colspan="4" |Source:
|
|}

2005

|-
! colspan=2 style="background-color:#E9E9E9;text-align:left;vertical-align:top;" |Candidate
! style="background-color:#E9E9E9;text-align:left;vertical-align:top;" |Party
! style="background-color:#E9E9E9;text-align:right;" |Votes
! style="background-color:#E9E9E9;text-align:right;" |%
|-
|style="background-color:"|
|align=left|Sergey Shavrin
|align=left|United Russia
|55,329
|36.20%
|-
|style="background-color:"|
|align=left|Vladimir Kvachkov
|align=left|Independent
|44,167
|28.89%
|-
|style="background-color:"|
|align=left|Yanina Perepechaeva
|align=left|Independent
|7,428
|4.86%
|-
|style="background-color:"|
|align=left|Leonid Shpigel
|align=left|Independent
|5,751
|3.76%
|-
|style="background-color:"|
|align=left|Maksim Shugaley
|align=left|Independent
|2,566
|1.67%
|-
|style="background-color:#000000"|
|colspan=2 |against all
|28,933
|18.93%
|-
| colspan="5" style="background-color:#E9E9E9;"|
|- style="font-weight:bold"
| colspan="3" style="text-align:left;" | Total
| 152,832
| 100%
|-
| colspan="5" style="background-color:#E9E9E9;"|
|- style="font-weight:bold"
| colspan="4" |Source:
|
|}

2016

|-
! colspan=2 style="background-color:#E9E9E9;text-align:left;vertical-align:top;" |Candidate
! style="background-color:#E9E9E9;text-align:left;vertical-align:top;" |Party
! style="background-color:#E9E9E9;text-align:right;" |Votes
! style="background-color:#E9E9E9;text-align:right;" |%
|-
|style="background-color:"|
|align=left|Anton Zharkov
|align=left|United Russia
|56,431
|33.75%
|-
|style="background-color:"|
|align=left|Anatoly Vasserman
|align=left|A Just Russia
|32,379
|19.37%
|-
|style="background-color:"|
|align=left|Nikolay Korsakov
|align=left|Communist Party
|17,032
|10.19%
|-
|style="background-color:"|
|align=left|Olga Demicheva
|align=left|Yabloko
|16,708
|9.99%
|-
|style="background-color:"|
|align=left|Andrey Kireev
|align=left|Liberal Democratic Party
|13,458
|8.05%
|-
|style="background-color:"|
|align=left|Yelena Barsukova
|align=left|The Greens
|6,311
|3.77%
|-
|style="background:;"| 
|align=left|Arseny Belenky
|align=left|Party of Growth
|5,363
|3.21%
|-
|style="background:;"| 
|align=left|Vadim Korovin
|align=left|People's Freedom Party
|4,198
|2.51%
|-
|style="background:;"| 
|align=left|Konstantin Bely
|align=left|Rodina
|3,378
|2.02%
|-
|style="background:;"| 
|align=left|Vadim Saltanovich
|align=left|Communists of Russia
|2,811
|1.68%
|-
|style="background:#00A650;"| 
|align=left|Yevdokia Shlyapina
|align=left|Civilian Power
|1,849
|1.11%
|-
|style="background:"| 
|align=left|Dmitry Mashenskikh
|align=left|Patriots of Russia
|1,266
|0.76%
|-
|style="background:;"| 
|align=left|Ivan Kononov
|align=left|Civic Platform
|1,155
|0.69%
|-
| colspan="5" style="background-color:#E9E9E9;"|
|- style="font-weight:bold"
| colspan="3" style="text-align:left;" | Total
| 167,199
| 100%
|-
| colspan="5" style="background-color:#E9E9E9;"|
|- style="font-weight:bold"
| colspan="4" |Source:
|
|}

2021

|-
! colspan=2 style="background-color:#E9E9E9;text-align:left;vertical-align:top;" |Candidate
! style="background-color:#E9E9E9;text-align:left;vertical-align:top;" |Party
! style="background-color:#E9E9E9;text-align:right;" |Votes
! style="background-color:#E9E9E9;text-align:right;" |%
|-
|style="background-color: " |
|align=left|Anatoly Vasserman
|align=left|Independent
|75,281
|33.66%
|-
|style="background-color: " |
|align=left|Sergey Obukhov
|align=left|Communist Party
|54,062
|24.18%
|-
|style="background-color:"|
|align=left|Alyona Popova
|align=left|Yabloko
|15,482
|6.92%
|-
|style="background-color: "|
|align=left|Yulia Gladkova
|align=left|Russian Party of Freedom and Justice
|13,891
|6.21%
|-
|style="background-color: "|
|align=left|Vyacheslav Demchenko
|align=left|New People
|13,669
|6.11%
|-
|style="background-color: " |
|align=left|Anton Medvedev
|align=left|Liberal Democratic Party
|13,651
|6.10%
|-
|style="background: ;"| 
|align=left|Nadezhda Zagordan
|align=left|Green Alternative
|12,327
|5.51%
|-
|style="background-color: " |
|align=left|Yaroslav Sidorov
|align=left|Communists of Russia
|7,245
|3.24%
|-
|style="background: ;"| 
|align=left|Marina Kostycheva
|align=left|Rodina
|5,814
|2.60%
|-
|style="background-color: " |
|align=left|Natalya Koryagina
|align=left|Party of Growth
|3,919
|1.75%
|-
|style="background: ;"| 
|align=left|Nikita Ishchenko
|align=left|Civic Platform
|2,542
|0.98%
|-
| colspan="5" style="background-color:#E9E9E9;"|
|- style="font-weight:bold"
| colspan="3" style="text-align:left;" | Total
| 223,619
| 100%
|-
| colspan="5" style="background-color:#E9E9E9;"|
|- style="font-weight:bold"
| colspan="4" |Source:
|
|}

Notes

Sources
205. Преображенский одномандатный избирательный округ

References

Russian legislative constituencies
Politics of Moscow